Eszter Krutzler (born March 4, 1981 in Szombathely, Vas) is a female weightlifter from Hungary. She became an Olympic medalist during the 2004 Summer Olympics when she won the silver medal in the women's – 69 kg class.

Major results

References 
sports-reference

1981 births
Living people
Hungarian female weightlifters
Olympic weightlifters of Hungary
Weightlifters at the 2004 Summer Olympics
Olympic silver medalists for Hungary
Olympic medalists in weightlifting
Medalists at the 2004 Summer Olympics
European Weightlifting Championships medalists
World Weightlifting Championships medalists
Sportspeople from Szombathely
21st-century Hungarian women